Welton Felipe Paraguá de Melo (born 6 August 1997), commonly known as Welton Felipe or Chimbinha, is a Brazilian footballer who currently plays as a forward for Bulgarian club Levski Sofia.

Honours

Club
Levski Sofia
 Bulgarian Cup (1): 2021–22

Career statistics

Club

Notes

References

External links
 

Living people
1997 births
Brazilian footballers
Association football forwards
Maringá Futebol Clube players
Esporte Clube XV de Novembro (Piracicaba) players
Botafogo Futebol Clube (PB) players
Campeonato Brasileiro Série C players
Campeonato Brasileiro Série D players
Campeonato Paranaense players
PFC Levski Sofia players
First Professional Football League (Bulgaria) players